Events from the year 1780 in France

Incumbents
 Monarch – Louis XVI

Events
17 April – Battle of Martinique

Births
6 August – Georges Humann, financier and politician (died 1842)

Deaths
 
25 January – André Levret, obstetrician (born 1703)
12 April – Camille, Prince of Marsan, nobleman and Prince of Lorraine (born 1725)
3 August – Étienne Bonnot de Condillac, philosopher (born 1715)
14 October – Pierre-Joseph Bourcet, tactician, general, chief of staff, mapmaker and military educator (born 1700)
16 November – Nicolas Joseph Laurent Gilbert, poet (born 1750)
15 December – Charles-Henri-Louis d'Arsac de Ternay, naval officer (born 1723)

See also

References

1780s in France